Cadell ap Rhodri (854–909) was King of Seisyllwg, a minor kingdom in southwestern Wales, from about 872 until his death.

Life
Cadell was the second son of King Rhodri the Great of Gwynedd and Angharad, a princess from Seisyllwg. In 872 Angharad's brother Gwgon, King of Seisyllwg, drowned without leaving an heir. Rhodri became steward over the kingdom, and while he was unable to make a legal claim to the throne, he was able to install Cadell as king.

He passed it to his son, Hywel Dda, at his death in 909. Cadell and Hywel together also conquered Dyfed in 904905, establishing Hywel as the king in that region.  After his father's death, Hywel ruled the kingdoms jointly as Deheubarth.

Cadell had two other sons, Morgan and Cadwgan.

See also
Kings of Wales family trees

Footnotes

References
A history of Wales from the earliest time, John Edward Lloyd, 1911

House of Dinefwr
850s births
909 deaths
10th-century Welsh monarchs
Welsh princes
9th-century Welsh monarchs